Noreiga is a surname. Notable people with the surname include:

Anthony Noreiga (born 1982), Trinidadian footballer
Emelda Noreiga (born 1947), Trinidadian cricketer
Jack Noreiga (1936–2003), West Indian cricketer

See also
 Noriega